Inchydoney or Inchydoney Island (sometimes misspelled Inchadoney) is a small island off West Cork, Ireland, connected to the mainland by two causeways. The nearest town is Clonakilty. It has a Blue Flag beach.

It is a tourist destination with two beaches, one either side of the Virgin Mary headland. In summer there is a lifeguard station on the headland for three months.

History
The island was granted by Queen Elizabeth I to the Church of Ireland Bishop of Ross in 1584. During the Irish Confederate Wars, when a Protestant force led by Lord Forbes retook the town of Clonakilty from Catholic rebels in 1642, several hundred rebels fled towards the island to take refuge, but were caught and drowned in the rising tide before reaching Inchydoney.

Gallery

References

Islands of County Cork
Beaches of County Cork
Clonakilty
Former islands of Ireland